Prigogine's nightjar (Caprimulgus prigoginei) or the Itombwe nightjar, is a bird species of tropical central Africa. It is known from only one specimen taken at Malenge in the Itombwe Mountains in Zaire in August 1955.

It appears to be a forest species, but nothing is known of its habits or breeding, although it is likely to nest on bare ground like its relatives. It is assumed to be a nocturnal insectivore like other nightjars.

Prigogine's nightjar is a small nightjar at 19 cm, short-tailed and large-headed. The adult female is dark brown with heavy speckling. In flight it is again mainly brown, without the white wing marking found in many of its relatives. There are pale brown wing spots, and whitish tail feather tips. The male is unknown.

The male's song is unknown, but unidentified nightjar calls heard in the breeding area include a rapid churring and a knocking sound.

The common name and binomial commemorates the ornithologist Alexandre Prigogine.

References

 Nightjars by Cleere and Nurney,

External links
BirdLife Species Factsheet.

Prigogine's nightjar
Birds of Central Africa
Prigogine's nightjar
Species known from a single specimen